Vadzim Balbukh (born 4 May 1993) is a Belarusian professional footballer who is currently playing for Orsha.

References

External links

Profile at Pressball

1993 births
Living people
Belarusian footballers
Association football midfielders
FC Belshina Bobruisk players
FC Slonim-2017 players
FC Osipovichi players
FC Volna Pinsk players
FC Smorgon players
FC Khimik Svetlogorsk players
FC Orsha players